Norma Connolly (August 27, 1927 – November 18, 1998) was an American actress having a career spanning five decades and known for her roles on The Young Marrieds as Lena Karr Gilroy and General Hospital as Ruby Anderson.

Early life
Connolly was born on August 27, 1927, in Boston, Massachusetts to  Beulah and Archie Connolly, where her father owned a lumber business. She graduated from Brandeis University in 1958. Connolly studied acting with Morris Carnovsky at the Leland Powers School of Drama, with both Harold Clurman and Stella Adler at Actors Studio, and at the Cushing Academy.

Career
Connolly started her career as a guest star on Pulitzer Prize Playhouse in 1951. She next was in Celanese Theatre as Marcia in 1952. Connollly would guest star in a number of television programs such as Danger, Naked City, The Twilight Zone, Dr. Kildare, Mr. Novak, The F.B.I., I Dream of Jeannie, The Bold Ones: The New Doctors, Columbo, Little House on the Prairie, and Charlie's Angels. She starred in the Made-for-TV-Movies Mr. and Mrs. Cop and F. Scott Fitzgerald in Hollywood. Connolly starred the miniseries QB VII as Corinne. She is best known for her roles as Lena Karr Gilroy in The Young Marrieds from 1964 to 1966 and Ruby Anderson on General Hospital from 1979 to 1998. She was in Alfred Hitchcock's The Wrong Man (1956), Robert Lewin's Third of a Man (1962), Robert Mulligan's The Other (1972), and James Goldstone's They Only Kill Their Masters (1972). On stage, Connolly was in A Streetcar Named Desire, Night of the Iguana and The Crucible. She was nominated for a Daytime Emmy Award for her performance as Ruby Anderson in 1985 at the 12th Daytime Emmy Awards.

Personal life and death
Connolly married Howard Rodman in 1954; the marriage ended when he died on December 5, 1985. Together, they had three children: two sons and one daughter. She was active in the battle against AIDS, serving on the board of Hollywood Helps. Connolly addressed the concerns of actresses in their limited roles in television and film productions. She died on Wednesday, November 18, 1998, from complications of a stroke.

Filmography

Film

Television

Awards and nominations

See also

 List of longest-serving soap opera actors

References

External links
 
 
 Norma Connolly at Aveleyman

1927 births
1998 deaths
Actresses from Boston
American film actresses
20th-century American actresses
American television actresses
American soap opera actresses
Actors Studio alumni
Brandeis University alumni